The Brandt 200 is a  ARCA Menards Series race held during Speedweeks at Daytona International Speedway in February. It was previously known as the Daytona ARCA 200.

History

List of winners

Notes

References

External links
 

1964 establishments in Florida
ARCA Menards Series races
Motorsport in Daytona Beach, Florida
Recurring sporting events established in 1964
Annual sporting events in the United States
February sporting events
NASCAR races at Daytona International Speedway